Campo Grande, formerly Augusto Severo is a municipality in the state of Rio Grande do Norte in the Northeast region of Brazil.

From 1903 until 1991 Campo Grande was named Augusto Severo after noted Brazilian aeronaut Augusto Severo de Albuquerque Maranhão (1864–1902), who died in a fiery dirigible crash in Paris, France.

See also
List of municipalities in Rio Grande do Norte

References

Municipalities in Rio Grande do Norte

zh:Campo Grande